The Vertushka was a special internal telephone system in the Soviet Union, named after the Russian word for rotary dials, the existence of which on a telephone was a novelty in an era dominated by manual switchboards. The telephone is dial-less and directly linked to the Kremlin. It connected the leader to key subordinates, like regional party secretaries, high ranking military officials or important state-owned factory chiefs. Having a Vertushka reflected the high status of the owner in the hierarchy of governance. The telephone was designed only to receive calls from the leader. 

Parallel systems existed in other cities, as well as in the capitals of Soviet satellite states, as well as in many Soviet ministries and departments, to make up for an insufficiency in funding levels for a true national network; the legacy of this persisted beyond the fall of the Soviet Union, with approximately 20 percent of phones in 1991 existing on private networks.

References

Further reading
Breaking with Moscow, Arkady Shevchenko, Knopf (1985) 
Nomenklatura : the Soviet Ruling Class, Michael Voslensky ; translated by Eric Mosbacher ; preface by Milovan Djilas, Doubleday (1984) 

Telecommunications in Russia
Communications in the Soviet Union